Creelman is a village in the Canadian province of Saskatchewan within the RM of Fillmore No. 96 and Census Division No. 2. The village lies 118 km southeast of the City of Regina, on Highway 33.

History 

The Canadian Pacific Railway (C.P.R.) constructed a line in a southeasterly direction from Regina. Completed in 1904 the line was soon lined with a series of small communities and post offices. As early as 1903 a townsite was laid out on the line which locals decided to name Hazel. However, officials with the C.P.R. had other ideas and with the railway’s completion they renamed the tiny community Creelman after the company’s solicitor A.R. Creelman (that same year a post office was opened at the site). Gradually Creelman grew to become a thriving centre for the local farmers and would become an important market and social centre for the surrounding farming community. Creelman incorporated as a village on April 6, 1906.

Demographics 

Notable people 
Morris Mott, played in the NHL with the California Golden Seals and Winnipeg Jets

See also 
 List of communities in Saskatchewan
 Villages of Saskatchewan
 Creelman

References

External links 

Villages in Saskatchewan
Fillmore No. 96, Saskatchewan
Division No. 2, Saskatchewan